Alan Irwin Abel (August 2, 1924 – September 14, 2018) was an American hoaxer, writer, and mockumentary filmmaker famous for several hoaxes that became media circuses.

Education and early career 
Born on August 2, 1924, in Zanesville, Ohio, Abel graduated from the Ohio State University with a Bachelor of Science in education. One of Abel's earliest pranks took place in the late 1950s; he posed as a golf professional who taught Westinghouse executives how to use ballet positions to improve their games.

Beginning May 27, 1959, with a story on the Today Show, the Society for Indecency to Naked Animals (SINA), was Abel's most elaborate hoax. SINA's mission was to clothe naked animals throughout the world. They are best known today for their tagline: "A nude horse is a rude horse". As a spokesman for the group, Buck Henry appeared as "G. Clifford Prout" on television and radio several times, including the CBS Evening News on August 21, 1962. Abel himself appeared on The Mike Douglas Show to discuss the SINA mission. The hoax began as a satire of media censorship, but took on a life of its own with sympathizers offering unsolicited contributions (always returned), citizen summonses for walking naked dogs, and sewing patterns for pet clothes.

Yetta Bronstein, a fictional housewife and mother of one concocted by Abel, was a write-in candidate for President of the United States in both 1964 and 1968. A member of "The Best Party", Bronstein ran with the slogan "Vote for Yetta and things will get betta" and a platform which included National Bingo and a suggestion box in front of the White House. Alan Abel and his wife Jeanne both performed as Bronstein for phone interviews, and a photo of his mother was used as the face on campaign posters.

From 1966 to 1967, Abel wrote a weekly syndicated humor column "The Private World of Prof. Bunker C. Hill" that appeared in the San Francisco Chronicle and several other newspapers.

1970s 
Following the Watergate scandal, Abel hired an actor to pose as Deep Throat for a press conference in New York City before 150 reporters. Literary agent Scott Meredith offered $100,000 to buy the rights to his story. At the news conference, the Deep Throat impostor quarreled with his purported wife, then fainted and was whisked away in a waiting ambulance.

In the early 1970s, Abel appeared on the game show To Tell the Truth with his head wrapped in bandages. This was not so that he would not be recognized, but so the panel would not identify his two imposters: well-known actors Larry Blyden and Tom Poston.

Abel wrote, produced, and directed two mockumentaries: Is There Sex After Death? (1971) and The Faking of the President (1976).

In 1979, Abel staged his own death from a heart attack near the Sundance Ski Lodge. A fake funeral director collected his belongings, and a woman posing as his widow notified The New York Times. The Times published an obituary January 2, 1980 (a rare example of a premature obituary). On January 3, 1980, Abel held a news conference to announce,  "[the] reports of my demise have been grossly exaggerated".

Omar's School for Beggars was a fictional school for professional panhandlers. As Omar, Abel was invited to numerous television talk shows, including the Tomorrow Show hosted by Tom Snyder and the shows of Morton Downey, Jr., Sally Jessy Raphael, Mike Douglas, and Sonya Friedman, who was especially upset because Omar ate his lunch on camera. The hoax was a satirical commentary on the rise of unemployment and homelessness in the U.S. Omar's TV appearances spanned from 1975 to 1988, though he had been exposed several times.

Mass fainting hoax 
Abel was behind one of the most talked-about incidents in The Phil Donahue Show'''s history on January 21, 1985, soon after the show's well-publicized move of its operations from Chicago to WNBC New York. On that day's program, seven members of the audience appeared to faint during the broadcast, which was seen live in New York. Donahue feared the fainting was caused by both anxiety at being on television and an overheated studio on a morning that was cold and snowy outside. He eventually cleared the studio of audience members and then resumed the show. The fainting "spell" turned out to have been cooked up by Abel in what he said was a protest against poor-quality television.

 Parodies 
In 1993, when euthanasia and Jack Kevorkian were common topics in the news, Abel set up the bogus Florida company "Euthanasia Cruises, Ltd.", which would offer cruises allowing suicidal participants to jump into the ocean after three days of partying. He revived this hoax in a column in 2006.

In 1997, Abel launched CGS Productions to promote gift-wrapped pint jars of Jenny McCarthy's urine. (A parody of McCarthy's role in a shoe commercial where she appeared sitting on a toilet.) The name of the communications director for CGS Productions was Stoidi Puekaw – "wake up idiots" backwards. 
 
Abel once ran for Congress on a platform that included paying congressmen based on commission; selling ambassadorships to the highest bidder; installing a lie detector in the White House and truth serum in the Senate drinking fountain; requiring all doctors to publish their medical-school grade point average in the telephone book after their names; and removing Wednesday to establish a four-day workweek.

 Later career 
In 1999, Abel appeared in the documentary Private Dicks: Men Exposed, in which he claimed to be the current holder of the Guinness World Record for the smallest penis. Abel, who initially appeared in the video as "Bruce the musician" (later versions of the documentary changed this to reflect that Abel was a prankster), did not disrobe for the documentary crew, and said that he would only do so if they were to have group sex afterwards. Abel stated, "They said no. So I didn't have to take off my shorts."

At the 2000 Republican National Convention in Philadelphia, Abel introduced a campaign to ban all breastfeeding because "it is an incestuous relationship between mother and baby that manifests an oral addiction leading youngsters to smoke, drink, and even becoming antisocial." After 200 interviews over two years, Abel confessed the hoax in U.S. News & World Report.

Abel died on September 14, 2018, at his home in Southbury, Connecticut, from complications of cancer and heart failure.

Documentary
In 2004, his daughter Jenny Abel, along with Jeff Hockett, made a documentary film of Abel's life called Abel Raises Cain, which played at the Boston Independent Film Festival and the 2005 Slamdance Film Festival, where it won first prize for Best Documentary. It has been released on DVD.

 Books 
 The Great American Hoax (1966)
 The President I Almost Was by "Mrs. Yetta Bronstein" (Abel and his wife) (1966)
 Confessions of a Hoaxer (1970, Macmillan)
 The Fallacy of Creative Thinking (as Bruce Spencer, 1972)
 The Panhandlers Handbook (as Omar the Beggar, 1977)
 Don't Get Mad, Get Even (1983, Sidg. & J)
 How to Thrive on Rejection'' (1983, W W Norton & Co Ltd, as W. W. Norton)

See also
Joey Skaggs, a more recent performer of media hoaxes including Cathouse for Dogs(1976)

References

External links 
 
 Abel Raises Cain at SnagFilms

 Abel Raises Cain Documentary
 

1924 births
2018 deaths
People from Zanesville, Ohio
Writers from Ohio
Ohio State University College of Education and Human Ecology alumni
American jazz percussionists
American filmmakers
Jazz musicians from Ohio
Deaths from cancer in Connecticut
Hoaxers